

Overview
Zimbabwe, a country in southern Africa, is suffering widespread malnutrition and diseases, such as HIV/AIDS, tuberculosis, and malaria. "One in four human beings is malnourished" in Africa, but Zimbabwe is near the deep end with almost 12,000 children alone suffering from severe malnutrition (Turner 8).  Zimbabweans suffer from lack of food, sustenance, and the politicization of food, but these can be fixed by the fortification of basic foods, the resolution of the political problems in Zimbabwe, and continuing aid from non-governmental organizations (NGOs). Causes of malnutrition include unending poverty.

References

Further reading
 Chinake, Hazel. "Journal of Social Development in Africa (39-51)." digital.lib.msu.edu. N.p., 1997. Web. 16 Mar. 2011.
 "Country Cooperation Strategy." who.int. WHO, May 2009. Web. 16 Mar. 2011.
 "Country Fact Sheet - 2006." who.int. WHO, 2006. Web. 16 Mar. 2011.
 "Malnutrition Figures Up- Survey." allAfrica. N.p., 10 June 2010. Web. 13 Mar. 2011.
 Mutseyekwa, Tapuwa, and Tsitsi Singizi. "Treating malnutrition as Zimbabwe grapples with raging inflation." unicef.org. UNICEF, 28 Oct. 2008. Web. 15 Mar. 2011.
 Sollom, Richard, and Chris Beyrer. "Health in Ruins: A Man-Made Disaster in Zimbabwe." physiciansforhumanrights.org. PHR, Jan. 2009. Web. 14 Mar. 2011. Physiciansforhumanrights.org.
 Tsvangiari, Morgan. "Malnutrition bites in desperate Zimbabwe." articles.cnn.com. CNN, 11 Dec. 2008. Web. 13 Mar. 2011.
 Turner, Paul. "Our Human Responsibility." Practical Solutions Magazine (8-9). N.p., Jan. 2009. Web. 18 Mar. 2011.
 "Zimbabwe child malnutrition rises." news.bbc.co.uk. BBC, 27 Dec. 2008. Web. 15 Mar. 2011.

Malnutrition
Health in Zimbabwe